Allemaal tuig!  is a 1981 Dutch television series directed by Ben Sombogaart.

Plot
A gang of youths is arrested by the police on charges of theft and vandalism. They must all wait at home (as a form of house arrest) to be summoned in court. Through a series of flashbacks the viewer gains insight as to how the gang lost its way.

Cast
 Tonny Tedering - Bart
 Floris Andringa - Monne
 Annemarie van Ginkel - Anja
 Pieter Hessel - Wijnand
 Femy Keuben - Shirley
 Ronald Straub - Leen
 Germaine Groenier - television reporter

External links 
 

Dutch drama television series
1981 television series debuts